Jammura is a village in Kalikapur Union in Chauddagram Upazila of Comilla District in the Division of Chittagong, Bangladesh.

References

Villages in Comilla District
Villages in Chittagong Division